Enicodes fichteli is a species of beetle in the family Cerambycidae. It was described by Schreibers in 1902. It is known from New Caledonia and Australia.

References

Enicodini
Beetles described in 1902